The Oceanic island nation of Palau competed at the 2012 Summer Olympics in London from 27 July to 12 August 2012.
This was the nation's fourth consecutive appearance at the Olympics.

Five Palauan athletes were selected to the team, competing only in athletics, judo, swimming, and weightlifting; all of them had participated in their first Olympics. Sprinter Rodman Teltull, the youngest male athlete of the team, was the nation's flag bearer at the opening ceremony. Palau, however, has yet to win its first Olympic medal.

Athletics

Men

Women

Judo

Palau has qualified one judoka. Jennifer Anson earned a quota place in the women's −63 kg through her position at the Oceania Judo Championships.

Swimming

Palau has gained a "Universality place" from the FINA.

Women

Weightlifting

References

Nations at the 2012 Summer Olympics
2012
Olymp